Otto Cimrman (1 May 1925 – 11 June 1988) was a Czech ice hockey player who competed in the 1956 Winter Olympics.

References

1925 births
1988 deaths
Czech ice hockey centres
Olympic ice hockey players of Czechoslovakia
Ice hockey players at the 1956 Winter Olympics
Sportspeople from Chomutov
Piráti Chomutov players
HC Kometa Brno players
Czechoslovak ice hockey centres